Jason Richardson (born July 30, 1991) is an American guitarist. He is best known for his work as a guitarist in both Born of Osiris and Chelsea Grin. His playing style is extremely fast and technical. He currently works as both a solo artist and as an official member of All That Remains. He is also a sponsored artist of Ernie Ball Music Man.

On February 5, 2009, age 17, Richardson replaced Chris Storey of All Shall Perish as a touring member. In early 2010, Richardson left All Shall Perish and was asked to join Born of Osiris as a full-time guitarist.

In late 2011, Richardson parted ways with Born of Osiris. Then, in early 2012, he joined Chelsea Grin.

On September 21, 2015, Richardson chose to leave Chelsea Grin and form his own solo project.

In 2016, Richardson released his debut solo album entitled I. produced by Taylor Larson. The album featured ex- The Word Alive drummer Luke Holland as a member.  Along with Holland, the album had many guest appearances from the likes of Periphery's Mark Holcomb & Spencer Sotelo, Vocalist Lukas Magyar of Veil of Maya, and Jeff Loomis.

In 2017, he embarked on his first tour as a solo act with instrumental, progressive metal band Polyphia and math rock band Covet.

On November 9, 2018, it was reported that Richardson would replace the deceased Oli Herbert as live member for All That Remains Europe tour scheduled with Sevendust in December. Richardson has claimed he’s been a fan of All That Remains since he was in high school. As of February 5, 2019, he is a full-time member of the group.

Between 2018 and 2022, Jason released 4 singles; "Tendinitis", "Upside Down (Featuring Tim Henson of Polyphia)", "Ishimura" and "p00mbachu" from his Sophomore album titled II, which was released on the 15th of July 2022. II features Luke Holland on drums.

Discography 

Born of Osiris (2009–2011)
 The Discovery (2011)

Chelsea Grin (2012–2015)
 Evolve EP (2012)
 Ashes to Ashes (2014)

As solo artist
 I (2016)
 I (The Orchestral Sessions) (2020)
 II (2022)

Featured Artist
 Suffokate - "Vanishing" (feat. Jason Richardson) (2011)
 Polyphia - "Aviator" (feat. Jason Richardson) (2015)
 Purge of Lilith - "Warrior" (feat. Jason Richardson) (2015)
 Veil of Maya - "Teleute" (feat. Jason Richardson) (2015)
 Polyphia - "Nasty" (feat. Jason Richardson) (2018)
 Within Destruction - "Sakura" (feat. Jason Richardson) (2020) 
 SION - "A Constant Reminder" (feat. Jason Richardson) (2021) 
 G2 - "Our Way" (feat. Jason Richardson, Tina Guo, Luke Holland, Carlos Ocelote, Taylor Davis, Noora Louhimo) (2022)
 August Burns Red - "Tightrope" - (feat. Jason Richardson) (2023)

As live member
 All Shall Perish (2009-2010)
 All That Remains (2018–2019, became full member in February 2019)

References 

1991 births
Living people
American heavy metal guitarists
All That Remains (band) members
21st-century American guitarists
Osbourn Park High School alumni